Theodore Rex, also known as T. Rex, is a 1996 buddy cop science-fiction comedy film written and directed by Jonathan Betuel and starring Whoopi Goldberg. Though originally intended for theatrical release, the film went direct-to-video, and consequently became the most expensive direct-to-video film ever made at the time of its release.

The film was not well-received, and saw Whoopi Goldberg being nominated for Worst Actress at the 1996 Golden Raspberry Awards. It is the first direct-to-video movie to receive any sort of Razzie nomination.

Plot 

In an alternate futuristic society where humans and anthropomorphic dinosaurs co-exist, a tough police detective named Katie Coltraine (Whoopi Goldberg) is paired with an anthropomorphic Tyrannosaurus named Theodore Rex (George Newbern) to find the killer of dinosaurs and other prehistoric animals leading them to a ruthless billionaire bent on killing off mankind by creating a new ice age.

Cast

Live action 
 Whoopi Goldberg as Katie Coltrane
 Armin Mueller-Stahl as Elizar Kane
 Juliet Landau as Dr. Veronica Shade
 Bud Cort as Spinner
 Stephen McHattie as Edge
 Richard Roundtree as Commissioner Lynch
 Jack Riley as Alaric
 Joe Dallesandro as Rogan
 Calvin Scott as Smithersaurus

Voice cast 
 George Newbern as Theodore Rex
 Carol Kane as Molly Rex
 Hayward O. Coleman as Oliver Rex / Tina The Waitress
 Jan Rabson as Tina Rex
 Billy Bowles, Rodger Bumpass, Jennifer Darling, Denise Dowse, Bill Farmer, Anne Lockhart, Sherry Lynn, Mickie McGowan, Patrick Pinney, and Philip Proctor as Additional voices

Puppeteers 
 Kevin Carlson as Ankylosaurus Dad
 Charles Chiodo as Guy In The Bag
 Edward Chiodo as Caterpillar
 Steven Chiodo as Guy In The Bag
 Tom Fisher as Ankylosaurus
 Terri Hardin as Molly Rex (face performance)
 Bruce Lanoil as Theodore Rex (face performance) / Oliver Rex (face performance)
 Pons Maar as Theodore Rex (in-suit performer)
 James Murray as Tina The Waitress
 Tony Sabin Prince as Molly Rex (in-suit performer)
 Dwight Robers as Guy In The Bag
 Paul Salamoff as Various Dinosaurs
 Michelan Sisti as Various Dinosaurs
 Jack Tate as Various Dinosaurs

Reception 
Theodore Rex received negative reviews from critics and audiences. It received an approval rating of 0% on review aggregator Rotten Tomatoes, based on five reviews. Variety magazine gave the film a negative review, saying, "This is one T. rex that won’t be spared the tar pits." William Thomas of Empire magazine gave the film a one out of five stars and said, "Steer Clear".

In a 2015 interview with the Brazilian newspaper Folha de S.Paulo, Goldberg stated that this is the only film she regrets ever having done: "Don't ask me why I did it, I didn't want to", she said.

Goldberg lawsuit 
Though Whoopi Goldberg had made an oral agreement to star in the film in October 1992, she attempted to back out. Abramson filed a US$20 million lawsuit against Goldberg, which was settled quickly. Goldberg agreed to star in the film for $7 million, $2 million more than the amount originally agreed upon.

One of the attorneys on the case described this as being similar to the legal battle of Kim Basinger when she backed out of the film Boxing Helena.

Distribution 
The film was originally intended for theatrical release in North America during Christmas 1995, but a glut of competition as well as a rush on post production work for the effects heavy film led to New Line Cinema delaying release. They subsequently intended to release it to coincide with Goldberg's hosting stint at the Academy Awards the following year, but ultimately decided that it was in their best interests to release the film direct-to-video. This decision came as a result of failed test marketing in Las Vegas, Memphis, Portland, Maine and Providence. The film's $33.5 million budget made it the most expensive direct-to-video release at that time.

The international distributors to whom New Line had pre-sold the rights to the film adopted a different release strategy by distributing theatrically in every country except the United States and Italy.

References

External links 

 
 
 

1996 direct-to-video films
1996 films
American science fiction comedy films
American buddy cop films
American children's comedy films
1990s science fiction comedy films
Films about dinosaurs
Living dinosaurs in fiction
New Line Cinema direct-to-video films
Films about friendship
Puppet films
Films set in the future
1990s buddy cop films
Films scored by Robert Folk
1996 comedy films
1990s English-language films
1990s American films